Charles Evered (born November 12, 1964) is an American-born playwright, screenwriter and film director.

Born in Passaic, New Jersey, Evered grew up in Rutherford, New Jersey, the fifth child of Marie (née Cole) and Charles J. Evered.

Evered took his undergraduate degree from Rutgers-Newark and  an MFA from Yale University, where he studied with director George Roy Hill. He has won several awards for his writing including The Crawford Award, the Berrilla Kerr Award, the Alfred P. Sloan Fellowship at the Manhattan Theatre Club, the Chesterfield/Amblin Fellowship, (Sponsored by Steven Spielberg's Amblin Entertainment), the Edward Albee/William Flanagan Fellowship, the Bert Linder Fellowship and the Lucas Artist Fellowship at the Millay Colony.

His plays include Running Funny, (premiere at Williamstown Theatre Festival featured Paul Giamatti), Billy and Dago, (Actors Studio—NYC) premiere featured Scott Cohen, The Size of the World, (Yale Repertory premiere featured Liev Schreiber, Circle Repertory Company—NYC premiere featured Rita Moreno and Frank Whaley, directed by Austin Pendleton), The Shoreham, (LA premiere featured Eric Stoltz), Adopt a Sailor, (Town Hall—NYC premiere featured Sam Waterston, Eli Wallach and Neil Patrick Harris), Celadine, (premiere featured Amy Irving) and Class, (premiere featured Thaao Penghlis and Heather Matarazzo.) His plays have been published by Broadway Play Publishing, Samuel French and Smith and Kraus among others. Additional plays include: Traces, Wilderness of Mirrors, Bridewell, Ted's Head, Clouds Hill, Looking Again, (“Best Ten Minute Plays 2012”, Smith and Kraus) and Ten.

He has written screenplays and teleplays for studios such as Universal Pictures, NBC, Steven Spielberg's DreamWorks Pictures and Paramount Pictures. His produced film and television credits include an episode of Monk entitled “Mr. Monk and the Leper” for USA Network, starring Tony Shalhoub. Evered wrote and directed the feature film Adopt a Sailor, starring Peter Coyote and Bebe Neuwirth. Adopt a Sailor was an official selection at more than twenty national and international film festivals, premiering on Showtime. In addition, he wrote and directed the short film Visiting, which premiered at the Palm Springs International Film Festival. His second feature film as a director, A Thousand Cuts, starred Michael O'Keefe and was nominated for a Saturn Award by the Academy of Science Fiction, Fantasy and Horror Films. It was distributed by Kino Lorber. Evered's most recent film, Out, starred Gloria LeRoy and had its world premiere at the Newport Beach Film Festival. His play, Knock, Knock, premiered in London at Theatre503 in 2014. His newest play, An Actor's Carol, which he directed, premiered in December 2015 starring Tony winner Hal Linden and was nominated for eight Desert League Awards, winning the Bill Groves Award for “Outstanding Original Writing.”

Evered is founder of the "Evered House," a non profit artist residency for military veterans, first responders and those who serve in conflict zones. The residency house was located for four years in Flamingo Heights, California and moved to Port Haywood, Virginia in 2021. The program is dedicated to his father, a veteran of World War II. Evered himself served in the United States Navy Reserve, reaching the rank of Lieutenant. His work has been profiled in The New York Times, BBC World and on NPR, among other outlets. In 2010 he formed a production company called Ordinance 14.

Plays
Running Funny  (with Paul Giamatti and Nick Brooks, 1988)
Billy and Dago   (with William Francis McGuire, Peter Gregory, Scott Cohen, Damian Young, etc., 1989)
The Size of the World  (with Sean Cullen and Liev Schreiber, 1990/1)
Traces   (with Sean Haberle, 1990)
The Shoreham  (with Eric Stoltz, 2001)
Bridewell (2002)
Visiting , (2002)
Adopt a Sailor  (ten-minute version, with Sam Waterston, Bebe Neuwirth, Eli Wallach, etc., 2002)
Wilderness of Mirrors  (2003) published by Broadway Play Publishing Inc.
Clouds Hill  (2004) published by Broadway Play Publishing Inc.
Celadine  (with Amy Irving, 2004) published by Broadway Play Publishing Inc.
Ted's Head  (2004)
Adopt a Sailor    (Full length version) (2005) published by Broadway Play Publishing Inc.
Boston  (2008)
Looking Again (2009)
Ten  (2011)
Class (2013) published by Broadway Play Publishing Inc.
Knock Knock (2014) London premiere.
An Actor's Carol (2015)

References

External links 
 
 CharlesEvered.com

1964 births
Living people
20th-century American dramatists and playwrights
Writers from Los Angeles
Writers from Passaic, New Jersey
People from Princeton, New Jersey
People from Rutherford, New Jersey
Rutgers University alumni
Rutherford High School (New Jersey) alumni
Yale School of Drama alumni
University of California, Riverside faculty
United States Navy officers
Military personnel from New Jersey